Michael Riordan (born 3 December 1946) is an American physicist, science historian and author.

Riordan earned his doctorate from the Massachusetts Institute of Technology in 1973. He worked at the University of Rochester, then moved to the SLAC National Accelerator Laboratory and concurrently held an adjunct professorship at the University of California, Santa Cruz. While associated with SLAC, Riordan was elected a fellow of the American Physical Society and received a Guggenheim Fellowship in 1999. The American Institute of Physics honored Riordan with the 2002 Andrew Gemant Award.

Selected publications

Hoddeson, Lillian; Brown, Laurie; Riordan, Michael; Dresden, Max, eds. (1997). The Rise of the Standard Model: Particle Physics in the 1960s and 1970s. Cambridge University Press. ISBN 0521570824.

 Revised and updated electronic edition published in 2018 by Plunkett Lake Press.
Anderson, Bruce; Riordan, Michael (1977). The Solar Home Book: Heating, Cooling and Designing with the Sun. Cheshire Books. ISBN 09173520107.

References

Massachusetts Institute of Technology alumni
21st-century American male writers
Fellows of the American Physical Society
20th-century American male writers
1946 births
20th-century American physicists
21st-century American physicists
Particle physicists
Living people
American historians of science
Historians of physics
21st-century American historians
20th-century American historians